Arcadia–Bienville Parish Airport  is a public-use airport located two nautical miles (2.3 mi, 3.7 km) southwest of the central business district of Arcadia, in Bienville Parish, Louisiana, United States. It is owned by the City of Arcadia.

Facilities and aircraft 
It has one runway designated 14/32 with an asphalt surface measuring 3,000 by 75 feet (914 x 23 m).

For the 12-month period ending June 10, 2010, the airport had 9,300 general aviation aircraft operations, an average of 25 per day. At that time there were five single-engine aircraft based at this airport.

References

External links 
 Aerial photo as of 4 February 1998 from USGS The National Map
 

Airports in Louisiana
Buildings and structures in Bienville Parish, Louisiana
Transportation in Bienville Parish, Louisiana